Julie Ochipinti is a set decorator and art director.

She was nominated at the 79th Academy Awards for Best Art Direction, for the film The Prestige. She shared the nomination with Nathan Crowley.

Selected filmography

Behind Enemy Lines (2001)
Batman Begins (2005)
The Prestige (2006)
The Dark Knight Rises (2012)
John Carter (2012)
Westworld (2017–present)

References

External links

Set decorators
Art directors
Year of birth missing (living people)
Living people